Elections were held in Haliburton County, Ontario on October 27, 2014 in conjunction with municipal elections across the province.

Haliburton County Council
The Haliburton County Council consists of the reeves and deputy reeves of the four constituent municipalities. A warden is elected from the eight members.

Algonquin Highlands

Dysart et al

Highlands East

Minden Hills

References

Haliburton
Haliburton County